Abryushino is a rural locality (a village) in Pskovsky District, Pskov Oblast, Russia. The population was 2 .

Geography 
Abryushino is located 34 km southeast of Pskov (the district's administrative centre) by road. Zaborovye is the nearest rural locality.

References 

Rural localities in Pskov Oblast